The Laboratory for Foundations of Computer Science (LFCS) is a research institute within the School of Informatics at the University of Edinburgh, in Scotland.  It was founded in 1987 and is a community of theoretical computer scientists with interests in concurrency, semantics, categories, algebra, types, logic, algorithms, complexity, databases and modelling.

References

External links 
LFCS website
People

University of Edinburgh School of Informatics
Science and technology in Edinburgh
1987 establishments in Scotland
Educational institutions established in 1987